Public transport is the main means of transportation in Eswatini. Car ownership is low, at 89 cars per 1,000 people (2014). The National Road Network has 1500 km of main roads and 2270 km of district roads.

Roads 
total: 3,594 km
paved: 1,078 km
unpaved: 2,516 km (2002)

Amongst its roadway network, the main roads are:

MR1 Mbabane - Piggs Peak - Jeppes Reef, border with South Africa.
MR3 Ngwenya, border with South Africa - Mbabane - Manzini - Hlane - Lomashasha, border with Mozambique. This is the most important highway.
MR8 Manzini - Big Bend - Lavumisa, border with South Africa.
MR9 Manzini - Nhlangano - Mahamba, border with South Africa.
MR11 Nhlangano - Lavumisa, border with South Africa.
MR19 Mbabane - Nertson, border with South Africa.

The MR3 road also includes a section, going from the Ngwenya border crossing, through Mbabane and until Manzini, with 4 lanes and has been upgraded as a motorway. This motorway section has a length of 56 km.

Railways 

total:
301 km (2008), 297 km; note - includes 71 km which are not in use (1997 est.)
narrow gauge:
301 km (2008), 297 km  gauge (1997 est.)

Ports 
none - Landlocked

Airports 
The country's main airport is King Mswati III International Airport, which has a 3,600m runway.  The other paved airport is Matsapha Airport

Other airports - with unpaved runways 
total: 13
914 to 1,523 m: 6
under 914 m: 7 (2012)

See also 
 Eswatini
 List of airports in Eswatini

References